Sangwolgok Station is a railway station on Seoul Subway Line 6 in Seongbuk-gu, Seoul. The Korea Institute of Science and Technology is near this station.

Station layout

References 

Metro stations in Seongbuk District
Railway stations opened in 2000
Seoul Metropolitan Subway stations